Mansuri-ye Vosta (also Romanized as Manşūrī-ye Vosţá; also known as Aḩshām-e Bakhshū’ī, Manşīreya, Manşīrīā, and Manşūrī) is a village in Ahram Rural District, in the Central District of Tangestan County, Bushehr Province, Iran. At the 2006 census, its population was 67, in 18 families.

References 

Populated places in Tangestan County